David Reierson (born August 30, 1964) is a Canadian former ice hockey defenceman. He played two games in the National Hockey League for the Calgary Flames during 1988–89 season. Reierson was drafted by the Flames in the 2nd round 
(29th pick overall) of the 1982 NHL Entry Draft.

Reierson was born in Bashaw, Alberta. He played junior hockey with the Prince Albert Raiders of the Saskatchewan Junior Hockey League, helping to lead the Raiders to back to back SJHL titles, and Centennial Cup championships as Canadian Junior A champions in 1981 and 1982. He then played four seasons of college hockey with the Michigan Tech Huskies before turning pro in 1987. Reierson played two seasons in the Flames system before heading to Europe to finish his career. Reierson played for several teams in France, Finland and Germany before retiring in 1999 after helping French club HC Amiens to the Ligue Magnus championship.

Career statistics

External links

1964 births
Living people
Augsburger Panther players
Calgary Flames draft picks
Calgary Flames players
Canadian expatriate ice hockey players in Finland
Canadian expatriate ice hockey players in Germany
Canadian expatriate ice hockey players in the United States
Canadian ice hockey defencemen
Hannover EC players
Ice hockey people from Alberta
Michigan Tech Huskies men's ice hockey players
Moncton Golden Flames players
People from Camrose County
Prince Albert Raiders (SJHL) players
Salt Lake Golden Eagles (IHL) players
Tappara players